is a Japanese long-distance runner. He competes in the 3000 metres steeplechase.

He finished fifth at the 2001 Summer Universiade in Beijing, won a silver medal at the 2002 Asian Games in Busan, Korea and finished eleventh at the 2003 World Championships in Paris. He also competed at the World Championships in 2001 and 2005 as well as the 2004 Summer Olympics without reaching the finals there.

He graduated from the Juntendo University.

Personal bests

References
 
 sports-reference

1979 births
Living people
People from Toyohashi
Japanese male long-distance runners
Japanese male steeplechase runners
Olympic male steeplechase runners
Olympic athletes of Japan
Athletes (track and field) at the 2004 Summer Olympics
Athletes (track and field) at the 2008 Summer Olympics
Asian Games silver medalists for Japan
Asian Games medalists in athletics (track and field)
Athletes (track and field) at the 2002 Asian Games
Medalists at the 2002 Asian Games
World Athletics Championships athletes for Japan
Japan Championships in Athletics winners
Fujitsu people
Japanese male cross country runners
20th-century Japanese people
21st-century Japanese people